Liza Victoria Huber (born February 22, 1975) is an American television actress, best known for her role as Gwen Hotchkiss on the daytime soap Passions. She is the daughter of actress Susan Lucci.

In 2008, she retired from acting to spend time with her family.

Career
Huber appeared with her mother in a 1993 Ford Motor Company advertisement. Huber's television debut was an uncredited role in Lifetime's original movie, Ebbie (1995), which starred her mother.

In 1999, Huber was announced as a cast member in the new NBC daytime soap Passions.  She left the show in 2000, when she announced she was quitting acting to return to New York and be near her fiancé at the time.

In 2000, she was named Miss Golden Globe, an honor the Golden Globe Awards show gives each year to the daughter of a celebrity. Huber was asked to return to Passions in 2002, after her replacement Natalie Zea chose to depart the role of Gwen when her contract ended.

Huber starred in and co-produced the play Four Dogs and a Bone at the Harold Clurman Theater in New York City, as part of her student acting requirements. For a week in October 2003, she appeared on the game show Hollywood Squares.

Personal life
Liza is currently an entrepreneur, founding the company Sage Spoonfuls in 2011, along with residing in Wayland, Massachusetts with her husband, Alex Hesterberg whom she met in first grade and eventually married in 2004, and her four kids, Royce (born December 23, 2006), Brendan, Hayden and Mason.

References

External links
 

1975 births
Living people
Female models from New York (state)
American soap opera actresses
American people of Italian descent
Actresses from New York (state)
People from Garden City, New York
20th-century American actresses
21st-century American actresses